The Hawthorn Football Club are a professional Australian rules football club that competes in the Australian Football League. This article lists all seasons dating back to Hawthorn's inaugural season in the Victorian Football Association in 1914. Hawthorn has appeared in the finals 36 times, reaching the Grand Final 19 times, and winning 13 premierships.

VFA/VFL/AFL Seasons 
Note: Statistics are correct as of the end of the 2022 AFL season.

All-time records

AFL Women's Seasons 
Note: Statistics are correct as of the end of the S7 (2022).

All-time records

References 

Hawthorn Football Club seasons
Hawthorn Football Club
Australian rules football-related lists